Lisa Raymond and Rennae Stubbs were the defending champions, but lost in the final to Martina Hingis and Anna Kournikova. The score was 6–2, 7–5 in the final.

Seeds

Draw

Draw

References

External links
 Official results archive (ITF)
 Official results archive (WTA)

Advanta Championships of Philadelphia
2000 WTA Tour